Renee Forth (born 28 January 1987) is an Australian rules footballer who played for Greater Western Sydney and Adelaide in the AFL Women's (AFLW).

Amateur career
Forth played state league football for the Coastal Titans in the West Australian Women's Football League (WAWFL). She played in the club's 2012 and 2015 premiership sides.

Forth captained Fremantle in the 2016 women's AFL exhibition series. Forth was appointed the 2016 WA State Female Football Ambassador serving as a role model through ongoing promotion and programs.

AFL Women's career
Forth was one of two Greater Western Sydney marquee players announced prior to the inaugural 2017 season. 

She ruptured her anterior cruciate ligament and medial collateral ligament in a WAWFL match in August 2016, and was ruled out for the entirety of the 2017 AFL Women's season.

She will serve as an assistant coach at the Giants in 2017.

In June 2018, Forth was traded to Adelaide.

Forth was awarded the Education and Training Excellence Award, presented by La Trobe University, for 2017 at the AFL Players’ Association’s MVP Awards night alongside Carlton’s Ed Curnow.

In May 2021, Adelaide announced that they would not offer Forth a new contract.

Other work
Outside of football, Forth works as an electrician. 

Forth has spent some time as a mentor, assistant coach and coach. Forth was mentor coach for the NAB AFL Women’s Academy. She was an assistant coach for the 2017 Allies team in the NAB AFL Women’s Under 18 Championships.  Forth served as an assistant coach for the Allies when they took on Victoria in the NAB AFLW Under 18 Exhibition Match August 2018. Forth assistant coached the Central Allies at the 2018 AFL Under-18 Youth Girls Championship on the Gold Coast.

References

External links

Living people
1987 births
Australian rules footballers from Western Australia
Greater Western Sydney Giants (AFLW) players
Adelaide Football Club (AFLW) players
Lesbian sportswomen
Australian LGBT sportspeople
LGBT players of Australian rules football
Technicians